Tectariopsis henrici is an extinct species of sea snail, a marine gastropod mollusk, in the family Turbinidae.

References

henrici
Gastropods described in 1835